Brian Bromley (20 March 1946 – 9 March 2012) was an English footballer who played for Bolton Wanderers, Portsmouth, Brighton and Hove Albion, Reading and Darlington in the Football League and Wigan Athletic in the Northern Premier League.

Career
Born in Burnley, Lancashire, Bromley started his career at Bolton Wanderers. He made his debut in March 1963 against Sheffield United, and made a total of 184 appearances in all competitions for the club, scoring 26 goals. In November 1968, he joined Portsmouth for a fee of £25,000.

In 1975, he joined Northern Premier League side Wigan Athletic, making 23 league appearances during his sole season the club.
In the 1976/77 season Brian joined Waterlooville Football Club playing in the Southern League Div 1 South playing under David Munks.

References

External links
 

Footballers from Burnley
1946 births
2012 deaths
English footballers
Bolton Wanderers F.C. players
Portsmouth F.C. players
Brighton & Hove Albion F.C. players
Reading F.C. players
Darlington F.C. players
Wigan Athletic F.C. players
Association football midfielders